The 2016 Campeonato Brasileiro Série D, the fourth level of the Brazilian League, was contested by 68 clubs. The competition started on 12 June and is ended on 1 October. The four teams in the semifinals, CSA, Moto Club, São Bento and Volta Redonda were promoted to the 2017 Campeonato Brasileiro Série C.

Volta Redonda were champions, beating CSA in the final.

Competition format
In the first stage, 68 teams were divided into seventeen groups of four, organized regionally. The teams played home and away against the other three teams in their group, a total of six games. The winner of each group plus the best 15 runners-up qualified for the second stage. From the second stage on the competition was played as a knock-out tournament. The four semi-finalists qualified for the 2017 Campeonato Brasileiro Série C. The winners of the semifinals played the final over two legs to determine the champion.

First stage
As at 17 July 2016

Group A1

Group A2

Group A3

Group A4

Group A5

Group A6

Group A7

Group A8

Group A9

Group A10

Group A11

Group A12

Group A13

Group A14

Group A15

Group A16

Group A17

Second stage
The Second stage was a two-legged knockout tie, with the draw regionalised.

Qualification and draw
The 32 qualifiers (17 group winners and 15 best performing group runners-up) were divided into two pots. Pot 1 contained the 16 best performing group winners. Pot 2 contained the worst performing group winner and the 15 qualifying group runners-up. In pot 1 the teams were numbered 1 to 16 in numerical order of the group they qualified from. In pot 2 the teams were numbered 17 to 32 in numerical order of the group they qualified from. In the case that one of the qualifying runners-up was from the same group as the worst performing group winner, both teams would be in pot 2 and the group winner would be numbered lower in sequence than the group runner-up.

To keep the draw regionalised Team 1 would play Team 18, Team 2 would play Team 17 and this pattern was repeated throughout the draw. The higher numbered team would play at home in the first leg.

Ranking of group winners
Ranking of group winners to determine the worst performing team to be placed into pot 2 was achieved by comparing 1) Points gained 2) Most victories 3) Best goal difference 4) Most goals scored 5) Sort.

Ranking of group runners-up
Ranking of group runners-up to determine the 15 best performing teams to be placed into pot 2 was achieved by comparing 1) Points gained 2) Most victories 3) Best goal difference 4) Most goals scored 5) Sort.

Qualification pots

Ties
Matches took place between 23 July and 7 August.

|}

Third stage
The third stage was also a two-legged knockout tie, with the draw regionalised. The ties were predetermined from the second stage, with the winner of second stage tie 1 playing the winner of second stage tie 2, etc.

Ties
First team in the draw has home advantage in the second leg.

|}

Final stage
The final stage was a two leg knockout competition with quarter-final, semi-final and final rounds. The draw for the quarter final was seeded based on the table of results of all matches in the competition for the qualifying teams. First would play eighth, second would play seventh, etc. The top four seeded teams would play the second leg at home. The four quarter-final winners were promoted to Série C for 2017. 

The draw for the semi final was seeded based on the table of results of all matches in the competition for the qualifying teams. First would play fourth, second would play third. The top two seeded teams would play the second leg at home.

In the final, the team with the best record in the competition would play the second leg at home.

Quarter final seedings

Quarter final ties

First team in the draw had home advantage in the second leg.

|}

Semi finals seedings

Semi finals ties
First team in the draw had home advantage in the second leg.

|}

Final
First team in the draw had home advantage in the second leg.

|}

References

Campeonato Brasileiro Série D seasons
2016 in Brazilian football leagues